HH Electronics is a British amplifier manufacturer, that was founded in 1968 by Mike Harrison, Malcolm Green and Graham Lowes in Harston near Cambridge, England, where its first solid state TPA and MA range of studio quality amplifiers were designed and manufactured. These amplifiers were used by many recording and broadcasting studios, including the BBC.

The company later moved to larger premises at Milton, Cambridgeshire, named the 'Dust Bowl' producing the first of the IC range of music amplifiers. The I/C100 Organ/Musical Instrument Amplifier, which gave a massive 100-watt RMS of undistorted power and featured a unique green electro-luminescent lit front panel which was to become one of HH's unique selling points, was produced with musicians [especially the semi-pro] and the retail music equipment market in mind. The separate 412BL [4 x 12"speaker] Bass/Lead Cabinet was also produced for the I/C100. The I/C100 was also put in a cabinet [called a Combo] with 2 x 12" Celestion Speakers.

Following a move to Bar Hill, Cambridge circa 1975, or just before, HH extended its range of sound reinforcement equipment to include models such as the MA100 Mixer Amplifier, a 100 watt, 5 channel PA amplifier 'head' with a switchable spring reverb. The IC100L, V-S Bass and the V-S Musician, a two-channel 100-watt guitar amplifier head with a spring reverb, separate gain and master volume controls and a built in switchable solid state distortion circuit. This circuit was designed to emulate valve amplifier distortion [hence V-S for valve sound] but with controllable master volume, the V-S circuit was encased in a block of resin to prevent copying by competitors. All the amplifiers were housed in smart slim carryable heads and 2 x 12 or 1 x 15 combo enclosures. Many new PA speaker cabinets were designed and put into production, such as the 212 & 412 Dual Concentric, 212BL, 215BL, 412BL, 115PA Radial Horns and Bass Bin + Piezo plus the Concert Series of pro PA systems. A large range of studio and live mixing consoles, from an 8:2 to a 24:8:2, was designed and manufactured in the early 1980s, plus an HH electric piano and a range of tape echo machines and effects pedals.

Loudspeakers were also designed and manufactured in-house with cast Magnesium Alloy frames under the supervision of HH Acoustics [led by acoustic guru Ed Form], in order to match the quality of the amplifiers and speaker cabinets.

Continuing designs brought along another of the first 19-inch rack mountable studio quality power amplifiers, the S500D, a favourite with the big pro touring and  hire companies. Producing nothing less than 250 watts RMS of power per channel, these amplifiers were ideal for the big touring supergroups in the 1980s. Also there was the V-series of amplifiers, including the V100, V200, V500 and V800 MOSFET.

HH moved premises again around 1985 to Clifton Road, Huntingdon, Cambridgeshire and began to develop new amplification products, such as the VX Range of 19" Rack Amplifiers, MXA and Invader series speakers.

In the 1990s they were bought out by Laney Amplification.

HH Electronics is now based in the West Midlands.

References 

 

Audio equipment manufacturers of the United Kingdom
Guitar amplifier manufacturers